Peligrosa is a Venezuelan TV series.

Peligrosa may also refer to: 
Peligrosa (Lartiste and Karol G song), a 2018 French pop song
Peligrosa (J Balvin song), a 2018 reggaeton song on album Vibras